Tunes of Glory is a 1956 novel by the British writer James Kennaway. It portrays the peacetime tensions in a Highland regiment shortly after the Second World War.

Adaptation
In 1960 it was made into the film Tunes of Glory directed by Ronald Neame and starring Alec Guinness and John Mills, with Kennaway adapting his own novel for the screenplay.

References

Bibliography
 Goble, Alan. The Complete Index to Literary Sources in Film. Walter de Gruyter, 1999.
 Watson, Roderick. The Literature of Scotland: The Twentieth Century. Macmillan, 2006.

1956 British novels
Novels by James Kennaway
British novels adapted into films
Scottish novels
G. P. Putnam's Sons books